Dowkushkan-e Hoseynkhani (also Romanized as Dowkūshkān-e Ḩoseynkhānī; also known as Dokūshkān-e Ḩoseynkhānī) is a village in Mahidasht Rural District, Mahidasht District, Kermanshah County, Kermanshah Province, Iran. At the 2006 census, its population was 43, in 11 families.

References 

Populated places in Kermanshah County